Andrew Sinton (born 19 August 1965) is a British rower. He competed in the men's lightweight double sculls event at the 1996 Summer Olympics.

References

External links
 

1965 births
Living people
British male rowers
Olympic rowers of Great Britain
Rowers at the 1996 Summer Olympics
Sportspeople from Windsor, Berkshire